The action of 11 January 1944 was a minor naval action that resulted in the sinking of the light cruiser  of the Imperial Japanese Navy by the British Royal Navy submarine .

Tally-Ho was patrolling from her base at Trincomalee, Ceylon searching for Japanese vessels and on 9 January, sighted the Japanese light cruiser Kuma off Penang. Kuma was on anti-submarine warfare exercises. She was flanked by destroyers and Tally-Ho could not get within range. She was able to plot the Japanese's route in and out of Penang and to take up a suitable position to intercept the cruiser.

On the morning of 11 January, Tally-Ho'''s commander, Leslie Bennington, spotted a Mitsubishi F1M2 Pete floatplane flying westwards along the route on which the cruiser that had been sighted on 9 January was to be expected. It was felt that this heralded the approach of the cruiser. Just before 09:00, the officer of the watch sighted the masts of the cruiser on the port bow. Kuma had a destroyer—Uranami—as an escort. Kumass lookouts soon spotted the torpedoes' wakes, and Captain Sugino shifted his rudder hard over. Kuma was hit starboard aft by two torpedoes. Bennington decided to head toward the shallows along the shore. The destroyer Uranami counterattacked with 18 depth charges, but all missed the submarine. A fire raged on board the Kuma and she soon began to sink by the stern. As she sank, her own depth charges detonated. Uranami'' then picked up the survivors, including Captain Sugino, while 138 crewmen were lost.

After his success, Bennington managed to slip away and returned to Trincomalee.

References
Citations

Bibliography

 
 
 
 
 
External links
 HMS Tally-Ho 

Conflicts in 1944
World War II operations and battles of the Southeast Asia Theatre
A
Naval battles of World War II involving Japan
Penang
1944 in British Malaya
Japan–United Kingdom military relations
January 1944 events